Evolution Theory (天演論) is Hong Kong singer Candy Lo's 9th studio album and her last with Sony Music. Lo co-produced the album with long-time collaborator Kubert Leung.

Track listing 
露西 (3,180,000 B.C.) Lou6 Sai1 (Lucy) – 3:32
天外飛仙 Tin1 Ngoi6 Fei1 Sin1 (Fairy From Wonderland) – 3:51
阿修羅樹海 A3 Sau1 Lo4 Syu6 Hoi2 (Asura Sea Of Trees) – 04:24
隔岸觀音 Gaak3 Ngon6 Gun1 Yam1 (Guan Yin from Across the Shore) – 3:53 –
一念天堂 Yat1 Nim6 Tin1 Tong4 (Momentary Thinking Of Heaven) – 3:38
步天歌 Bou6 Tin1 Go1 (Song Of Pacing The Heavens) – 3:54
女書 Neui5 Syu1 (Women's Script) – 3:49
笛卡兒的長生殿 Dek6 Ka2 Yi4 Dik1 Cheung4 Saang1 Din6 (Cartesian Immortal Palace) – 3:15
送魂經 Sung3 Wan4 Ging1 (Sutra For Seeing Souls Off) – 3:25
敵托邦的拾荒姑娘 Dik6 Tok3 Bong1 Dik1 Sap6 Fong1 Gu1 Neung4 (Junk Girl Of Dystopia) – 3:10
阿修羅樹海 (國) Ā Xiū Luó Shù Hǎi (Asura Sea Of Trees) – 4:24
露西 (3,180,000 B.C. – ) Lù Xī (Lucy) – 3:36

Candy Lo albums
2005 albums